Cha-214 or No. 214 (Japanese: 第二百十四號驅潜特務艇) was a No.1-class auxiliary submarine chaser of the Imperial Japanese Navy that served during World War II.

History
She was laid down on 10 June 1944 as ship 2064 at the Takamatsu shipyard of Shikoku Funabashi Kogyosho Co., Ltd. (株式會社四国船渠工業所) and launched on 21 September 1944. She was completed and commissioned on 8 December 1944, fitted with armaments at the Kure Naval Arsenal, and assigned to the Saiki Defense Unit, Kure Naval District. On 7 April 1945, she was assigned to the 2nd minesweeping division. On 10 April 1945, she was attached to the Shanghai Base Force (上海方面根據地隊所属), China Area Fleet (:jp:支那方面艦隊) and assigned to patrol, escort, and minesweeping activities in the Tsushima Strait. On 5 June 1945, she was assigned to the Shimonoseki Defense Force, Sasebo Naval District under the newly formed 7th Fleet. Cha-214 survived the war and was decommissioned on 30 November 1945.

On 1 December 1945, she was enrolled as a minesweeper by the occupation forces, one of 269 Japanese ships that served as a minesweeper under the Allied forces after the war. On 15 June 1946, she was demobilized. On 1 January 1948, she was released to the Ministry of Transportation. 

On 1 May 1948, she was assigned to the Japan Maritime Safety Agency, a sub-agency of the Ministry of Transportation, and designated on 20 August 1948 as Minesweeper No. 214 (MS-15). On 20 October 1949, she was re-designated as Minesweeper Special No. 214 (MS-15) and on 1 December 1951 she was assigned the name Hayatori (はやとり) (MS-15). On 1 August 1952, she was assigned to the Coastal Safety Force. She served as part of the Special Minesweeping Corps (:jp:日本特別掃海隊) during the Korean War. On 1 July 1954, she was transferred to the newly created Japan Maritime Self-Defense Force and re-designated on 1 September 1957 as Hayatori (MSI-699). She was delisted on 31 April 1965.

References

1944 ships
No.1-class auxiliary submarine chasers
Auxiliary ships of the Imperial Japanese Navy